The 2010-2011 season is the 59th season of competitive football in Vanuatu.

National teams 

The home team or the team that is designated as the home team is listed in the left column; the away team is

in the right column.

Senior

Friendly matches

Under-20

2011 OFC U-20 Championship

Under-17

2011 OFC U-17 Championship

Vanuatu Premia Divisen

Port Vila Premier League

National Soccer League

Vanuatuan clubs in international competitions

Amicale F.C.

References
 Vanuatu tables at Soccerway
 Vanuatuan national team at Soccerway